Dame Eadith Campbell Walker  (18 September 1861 - 8 October 1937) was an Australian heiress and philanthropist.

Life and career
Eadith Campbell Walker was born at The Rocks, Sydney, the only child of Scottish parents, Thomas Walker, a merchant, and his wife Jane (née Hart). The family moved to their home, Yaralla, an Italianate mansion on the Parramatta River in Concord West, an inner-western suburb of Sydney. Following the death of her mother, she was raised by her paternal aunt, Joanna Walker.

She and her father carried out numerous charitable works in Australia. When the First World War came she took a special interest in returned soldiers suffering from tuberculosis, and had 32 of them at "The Camp" in the grounds of Yaralla Estate from 1917 to 1920. From April 1917 to December 1922 she lent another home at Leura for the same purpose, and paid the entire cost of maintenance. It was afterwards made a children's home. She built cottages for elderly men at Yaralla, and provided an endowment fund for their upkeep, and also supported sporting clubs and religious, educational and health institutions, and after the First World War, returned soldiers.

Honours
She was appointed Commander of the Order of the British Empire (1917) and Dame Commander of the Order of the British Empire (4 June 1928) for philanthropic and charitable services.

Legacy

Dame Eadith died on 8 October 1937, aged 76, unmarried. She was cremated at the chapel in Rookwood, and her ashes were buried in the family grave at St John's Ashfield.  She left an estate of £265,000. After providing for many legacies to relations, friends and employees, one-third of the residue of the estate went to the Returned Soldiers' and Sailors' Imperial League of Australia, and the real estate to the Red Cross Society.

After her death, two-thirds of the income from £300,000 of her father's estate was set aside for the upkeep of the Thomas Walker Hospital, which had been built from 1891-93 with money provided by her father's will. Another £100,000 was used to turn Yaralla into the Dame Eadith Walker convalescent home for men, and one-third of the income from another sum of £300,000 was set aside for its maintenance. Both Yaralla and the Thomas Walker Hospital (now known as Rivendell Child, Adolescent and Family Unit) are now listed on the Register of the National Estate.

References

Sources
J. MacCulloch, 'Walker, Dame Eadith Campbell (1861 - 1937)', Australian Dictionary of Biography, Volume 12, Melbourne University Press, 1990, pp 356–57.

External links
 
 Walker, Eadith at The Dictionary of Sydney

1861 births
1937 deaths
Australian women philanthropists
Australian philanthropists
Australian Dames Commander of the Order of the British Empire
People from New South Wales
Australian people of Scottish descent
19th-century Australian women
20th-century Australian women